Ro Jong-suk is a female former North Korean international table tennis player.

Table tennis career
She won a bronze medal in the women's doubles with Li Song-suk at the 1979 World Table Tennis Championships.

See also
 List of table tennis players
 List of World Table Tennis Championships medalists

References

North Korean female table tennis players
World Table Tennis Championships medalists